Carlos Souto (Buenos Aires, May 13, 1955) is an Argentine advertising executive. He is regarded as one of the leading political advertising executives in Argentina. He runs the advertising agency South Communications, which has been engaged in political advertising since 1996. The work teams he organizes and leads have been a key factor in transforming the Latin American political language over the last decade. He took part in work teams with David Ratto, Ramiro Agulla, Dick Morris, Miguel Sal and Darío Lanis.

Childhood and Youth 

Carlos Souto was born in Parque Patricios neighborhood in Buenos Aires City, Argentina, on May 13, 1955. His parents, Maruja and Celestino, were Galician immigrants. Thanks to them and to his grandmother Carmen, both his sister Ana María and Carlos acquired Galician language before Spanish. He spends his childhood and early youth in the southern suburbs of Buenos Aires City. He started his studies at Colegio Bernasconi. Later, in second grade, he changed school (to Cangallo Schule, a German school in Balvanera neighborhood) where he completed his elementary and high school studies.

Cursus Honorum 
After the military coup in Argentina and considering the political commitment he had assumed as a student representative at the Buenos Aires University Engineering School, Souto travels to Brazil and settles in Sao Paulo City. His first job is as an office boy in the advertising agency Diálogo Propaganda. In 1976, he publishes his first and only storybook, illustrated by María Teresa Lemos Fontao. After a while, he starts working as a TV commercial production assistant. His beginnings are in Flipfilms and in the advertising agency Mauro Salles Interamericana. His rise is rapid.  In this way, he meets the French director Olivier Perroy, who jointly with Carlo Ponti, Jr., establishes the international “Filmar do Brasil”. In Angra dos Reis they produce the feature film “Pirañas.” This would be Souto’s only experience in feature films. During the four years he lived in Sao Paulo Carlos Souto shared an apartment, O Quatorze in Pinheros, with the Catalan plastic artist and advertising executive Xavier Ruáix Durán. O quatorze would turn into a place of worship for the intellectual, the creative and young moviemakers that came together in Sao Paulo during the second half of the 1970s. At the beginning of the 1980s, Souto decides to come back to Argentina. In 1983, he organizes his first business venture. In 1984, he establishes a company engaged in the development of brand events. Souto would work in the field of public relations and communication. In the following years, definitely settled in Argentina, Souto develops his first work team connected with the advertising industry.

First advertising hits 

In the late 1980s, Souto decides to focus all his experience in setting up a small advertising agency with Argentine share capitals.  The basics of his project would be the approach to communication, the primary function of which would be to respect the cultural identity of the society in which the company would operate. Even it could act as a forum to help understand the constructive potential of advertising in social development. As his project is settling, in 1991 he receives his first award, the third place in Clarín Award for Creativity in Newspapers.  This would be the beginning of a long path of recognitions for the development of his project. In those years he builds a famous duo with Darío Lanis that would be awarded both nationally and internationally. At the same time, he organizes a work team with remarkable young people like Juan Cravero, Carlos Bayala, Pablo del Campo, Gustavo Taretto, Fernando Tchechenitsky, and Álvaro Fernández Mendy. In 1993, he finally establishes his first advertising agency. In 1994, he enters the advertising agencies creative ranking of the Argentine Chamber of Advertisers, being in the tenth place in the country. In 1995, he participates for the first time in a selection process for the organization of a political campaign. He emerges as the winner; he runs his first political campaign and wins the election. Nevertheless, his communicational work in the goods and services market continues to collect many awards. A short time later he would be awarded with the “Silver Lion” on TV at the Cannes Festival, with a Gold on TV at the London Festival, with a Gold and a Platinum Pencil Award, besides the Grand Prix at Festival Iberoamericano de Publicidad (FIAP), and Gold awards on TV and Radio at the same festival.  He is also multi-awarded in Mexico, Brazil, and Colombia, apart from receiving noteworthy recognitions at festivals like the New York Festival or at the Argentine Circle of Creative Designers.  The first Souto’s website receives the Silver award at the London Festival and at FIAP. During 1999 he decides to set up a new company, Adlatina.com, a website specialized in marketing and advertising.

Political Marketing 

Carlos Souto begins his experience in the field of political advertising in 1995 and since then the team he leads has accompanied each of the most important moments in the history of Argentine elections. Throughout his career and thanks to his work, Carlos Souto is called for the most important political campaigns in Argentina, in which he achieves memorable hits. He wins two presidential elections, two elections for Buenos Aires Mayor, and one for Mendoza Province Governor. Recently, he has won a mid-term legislative election in Buenos Aires Province. He has the chance to be responsible for the institutional communication of several government efforts and to advise different politicians and businessmen in crisis situations. His work in the elections field is praised for the creative quality of the audiovisual pieces as well as for those of the public highway, apart from the standards applied to production. Many of the commercials he has made throughout his career are part of the communicational and cultural values of his country.

Political Campaigns

Awards 
In 2000, Carlos Souto was awarded with the Silver Cannes Lion at Cannes Festival. In addition, he was awarded with national and international awards, both in the political field and for his communication pieces, some of which are listed below.

 Cannes International Advertising Festival > Silver Lion - TV — Category Institutes
 London International Advertising Awards > Gold - Television - Category Retail Services
 London International Advertising Awards > Silver - Television - Category Web Sites
 London International Advertising Awards > Finalist - Television - Category Humour
 London International Advertising Awards > Finalist - Television - Category Direction/Dialogue
 London International Advertising Awards > Finalist - Television - Category Corporate
 London International Advertising Awards > Finalist - Television - Category Low Budget
 New York Festivals > Bronze - Television - Category Services
 New York Festivals >  Bronze - Television - Category Retail Dealers
 New York Festivals > Finalist - Television - Category Best Humorous Spot
 FIAP - (Latin American Advertising Festival) > Grand Prix - Radio - All categories
 FIAP - Golden Sun - Radio - Category Services
 FIAP - Golden Sun - Television - Category Education Institutes
 FIAP - Golden Sun - Radio - Category Campaigns
 FIAP - Golden Sun - Internet - Category Websites
 FIAP -  Finalist - Television - Category Services Campaign
 FIAP -  Finalist - Radio - Category Services Campaign
 FIAP -  Finalist - Radio - Category Education Institutes
 The One Show > The One Show Merit Award
 Brazilian Advertising Festival > Golden Lamp - Television - Category Services
 Brazilian Advertising Festival > Golden Lamp - Television - Category Education
 Brazilian Advertising Festival > Golden Sun - Radio - Category Services
 Festival Mundial de Publicidade de Gramado > Galo de Prata - Radio - Category Education
 Festival of Creativity > Grand Prix - Television
 Festival of Creativity > Golden Eagle - Television - Category Schools and Education Institutes
 Festival of Creativity > Bronze Eagle - Television - Category Schools and Education Institutes
 Latin American Golden Dial > Second Grand Golden Dial - Radio - All categories
 Latin American Golden Dial > Golden Dial - Radio - Category Services
 Argentine Circle of Creative Designers > Golden Tooth - Television - Category Services
 Golden Pencil > Golden Pencil - Radio - Category Education Institutes
 Platinum Pencil > Platinum Pencil - Radio - All categories
 Clarín Award for Creativity in Newspapers > First Prize - Black and White Graphics - Category Clothing
 Clarín Award for Creativity in Newspapers > First Prize - Black and White Graphics - Category Books Schools Universities
 Clarín Award for Creativity in Newspapers > Second Prize - Black and White Graphics - Category Clothing, Household Linens, Lingerie
 Clarín Award for Creativity in Newspapers > Third Prize - Black and White Graphics - Category Clothing
 Clarín Award for Creativity in Newspapers > TThird Prize - Black and White Graphics - Category Clothing
 National Advertising Contest > First Prize - Category Institutional
 National Advertising Contest > First Prize - Category Financial Institutions
 National Advertising Contest > Second Prize - Category Financial Institutions
 Ether Award for Radio Activity
 Reed Latino Awards > Best Gubernamental Communication Piece (2013)
 Victory Awards > Political Campaign of the Year (2014)
 Latino Reed Awards >  Consultant of The Year (2014)

References

External links 
 Souto Communications

Related Articles and Google Books 
 Alberto Borrini
 Gustavo Martínez Pandiani
 Ernesto Semán
 Marcelo Bonelli

1955 births
Living people
Argentine  advertising executives